Enrico Graber (born 17 June 1948) is an Italian luger. He competed in the men's doubles event at the 1968 Winter Olympics.

References

External links
 

1948 births
Living people
Italian male lugers
Olympic lugers of Italy
Lugers at the 1968 Winter Olympics
People from Olang
Sportspeople from Südtirol